Paige Wooding (born 23 April 1995) better known by the ring name Jamie Hayter is an English professional wrestler who is signed to All Elite Wrestling (AEW), where she is the current AEW Women's World Champion in her first reign. 

Prior to signing with AEW, she had wrestled primarily internationally, including in England's Revolution Pro Wrestling (RevPro), where she is a former RevPro British Women's Champion, and Japan's World Wonder Ring Stardom (Stardom), where she is a former SWA World Champion and a former Goddess of Stardom Champion (with Bea Priestley).

Professional wrestling career

Independent circuit (2015–2020) 
In 2017, Hayter participated in the Pro Wrestling Chaos company in the tournament to crown the first Maiden of Chaos Champion after defeating Dahlia Black in the quarterfinals and was eliminated in the final against Martina. On 4 October 2018 Hayter defeat Ayesha Raymond to win the WWW Women's Championship.

In November 2018, Jamie competed in Pro Wrestling Eve's annual tournament event named "She-1", a round robin block tournament which is styled after New Japan Pro Wrestling's G1 tournament. Hayter became the "Ace of Eve" after defeating Toni Storm and Kris Wolf in the finals.

Revolution Pro Wrestling (2015–2021) 
Hayter made her debut in professional wrestling on 25 May 2015, in a loss to Jinny Couture. At the end of June, Hayter debuted at Revolution Pro Wrestling in the RevPro Contenders 11 event defeating Zoe Lucas. In mid-2018, Hayter defeated Jinny to win the RevPro British Women's Championship for the first time in her career. On 28 July Hayter made her first successful defense of the British Women's Championship against Zoe Lucas. On 5 August Hayter made her second successful defense of title against Bobbi Tyler. On 18 November Hayter made her third successful defense of title against Kimber Lee. She lost the title to Zoe Lucas in her fourth defense on 2 December. She would regain the title on 7 February 2021, defeating Gisele Shaw. Revpro would vacated the title on 27 June 2021 when Hayter accepted an offer from WWE for a try-out the same date RevPro hosted a show.

World Wonder Ring Stardom (2018–2020) 

On mid-2018, Hayter made her debut for the World Wonder Ring Stardom promotion by entering the 5STAR Grand Prix 2018, which she failed to win, ending with 5 points. In early 2019, Hayter joined the stable Oedo Tai run by Kagetsu. In January 2020, Hayter and Bea Priestley became the first foreign team to win the Goddess of Stardom Championship, and Hayter would seven days later capture her first world title, defeating Utami Hayashishita for the SWA Undisputed Women's World Championship. However, she vacated the title in September 2020 since she was unable to work in Japan due to COVID-19 restrictions.

WWE (2019) 
On 15 May 2019 episode of NXT UK, Hayter made her first appearance for WWE, losing to Piper Niven in a squash match.

All Elite Wrestling (2019, 2021–present) 
On 23 October 2019 episode of AEW Dynamite, Hayter made her debut for AEW, losing to Britt Baker. During an interview backstage, Hayter was attacked by Brandi Rhodes. On 6 November Hayter picked up her first win teaming with Emi Sakura taking on Riho and Shanna. Hayter was set to work more with AEW whilst wrestling in Japan however because of the COVID-19 pandemic this halted plans.

Hayter returned to AEW on 13 August 2021 at the debut episode of AEW Rampage, assisting Baker in a post-match brawl against Red Velvet and Kris Statlander. Shortly after, it was announced that she had signed with AEW. She then aligned with Baker and her associate Rebel. On 3 November episode of Dynamite Hayter competed in the TBS Championship Tournament where Hayter defeated Anna Jay in the first round. On AEW Thanksgiving Eve special episode of Dynamite, Hayter lost to Thunder Rosa in the quarterfinals of the tournament. In 2022, Hayter competed in the Owen Hart Foundation Women's Tournament facing Skye Blue in a qualifying match on Rampage which Hayter won. On 11 May episode of Dynamite, Hayter was defeated by Toni Storm in the quarterfinals of the tournament. At Battle of the Belts III, Hayter challenged AEW Women's World Champion Thunder Rosa for the title in a losing effort, and suffered a broken nose during the match. At All Out, Hayter, Baker, Hikaru Shida and Storm competed against each other to become the interim AEW Women's World Champion which Hayter lost. 

At Full Gear, Hayter defeated Storm to become interim AEW Women's World Champion. On the following episode of Dynamite, Rosa relinquished the lineal title due to injury making Hayter the official and undisputed AEW Women's World Champion. Hayter's first successful title defense was against Shida in the main event of Dynamite special episode Holiday Bash. The match received positive reception from AEW backstage.

In 2023, At Revolution, Hayter defeated Ruby Soho and Saraya in a three-way match to retain her title. After the match, Soho attacked Hayter.

Personal life
In an interview with Women's Health UK in 2018, Wooding revealed that she has ADHD, and how professional wrestling helped her deal with it.

Championships and accomplishments 
 All Elite Wrestling
 AEW Women's World Championship (1 time, current)
 Big League Wrestling
 BLW Women's Championship (1 time)
 Pro-Wrestling: EVE
 Pro Wrestling: EVE International Championship (1 time)
 Pro Wrestling Illustrated
 Ranked No. 47 of the top 100 female singles wrestlers in the PWI Women's 100 in 2020
 Ranked No. 29 of the top 50 tag teams in the PWI Tag Team 50 in 2020 
 Revolution Pro Wrestling
 RevPro British Women's Championship (2 time)
 Sports Illustrated
 Ranked No. 6 in the top 10 wrestlers of 2022
 World War Wrestling
 WWW Women's Championship (1 time)
 World Wonder Ring Stardom
 Goddesses of Stardom Championship (1 time) – with Bea Priestley
 SWA World Championship (1 time)
 5★Star GP Award (1 time)
 5★Star GP Fighting Spirit Award (2019)

References

External links 

 
 
 

1995 births
All Elite Wrestling personnel
English expatriate sportspeople in Japan
English female professional wrestlers
Expatriate professional wrestlers in Japan
Living people
Sportspeople from Southampton
People from Eastleigh
English expatriate sportspeople in the United States
21st-century professional wrestlers
Goddess of Stardom Champions
SWA World Champions
AEW Women's World Champions
Undisputed British Women's Champions